Damir Ughlikesh (also romanized as Damīr Ūghlīkesh) is a village in Heyran Rural District, in the Central District of Astara County, Gilan Province, Iran. At the 2006 census, its population was 222, in 51 families.

References 

Populated places in Astara County